Starooskolsky (masculine), Starooksolskaya (feminine), or Starooskolskoye (neuter) may refer to:
Starooskolsky District, a district of Belgorod Oblast, Russia
Starooskolsky Urban Okrug, a municipal formation in Belgorod Oblast, Russia